Verdigris is a common term for copper(II) acetate, the green patina that forms on copper, brass and bronze, and which is used as a pigment.

Verdigris may also refer to:

Verdigris, Oklahoma
Verdigris (Doctor Who), a Doctor Who novel
Verdigris, a play by Jim Beaver
Verdigris agaric, common name for the fungus Stropharia aeruginosa

See also
Verdigris Township, Antelope County, Nebraska
Verdigris Township, Holt County, Nebraska
Verdigris River, in Oklahoma and Kansas